Phil Lloyd is the name of:

Phil Lloyd (actor), Australian actor
Phil Lloyd (footballer), English footballer

See also
Philip Lloyd, British Army officer and politician
Philip Lloyd (priest), Anglican priest